Marina Grigorievna Sidorova (née Nikiforova; born 16 January 1950) is a Russian former Soviet track and field sprinter. She was a seven-time Soviet champion, winning over distances from 100 metres to 400 metres.

Born in Saint Petersburg (then Leningrad), she made her Olympic debut at age twenty-two and was a 200 metres semi-finalist and helped the Soviet women to fifth in the 4 × 100 metres relay. Her greatest individual success came at the 1978 European Athletics Indoor Championships, where she won the women's 400 metres title. She took a 400 m bronze at the 1977 IAAF World Cup and was twice a 200 m silver medallist at the Universiade. She also won three individual medals at the European Cup during her career.

With the Soviet women's relay team, she won four bronze medals at major competitions. Her first came at the 1971 European Athletics Championships, alongside Lyudmila Zharkova, Galina Bukharina and Nadezhda Besfamilnaya. She won medals in both 4 × 100 metres relay and 4 × 400 metres relay at the 1977 IAAF World Cup and returned two years later to win another bronze in the 4 × 400 metres relay in a team anchored by future Olympic champion Lyudmila Kondratyeva.

She was the daughter of two former athletes who became athletics coaches, Grigory Nikiforov and Valentina Nikiforova, who propagated a new training technique for distance running, based on long, low-speed runs and short high-speed runs.

Personal bests
60 metres – 7.65 (1973)
100 metres – 11.2 (1973)
200 metres – 22.72 (1973)
400 metres – 50.98 (1977)

International competitions

National titles
Soviet Athletics Championships
100 m: 1974
200 m: 1973, 1974, 1977
400 m: 1977
Soviet Indoor Athletics Championships
400 m: 1977, 1978

See also
List of European Athletics Championships medalists (women)
List of European Athletics Indoor Championships medalists (women)

References

External links

Living people
1950 births
Soviet female sprinters
Russian female sprinters
Athletes from Saint Petersburg
Olympic athletes of the Soviet Union
Athletes (track and field) at the 1972 Summer Olympics
Universiade medalists in athletics (track and field)
Universiade silver medalists for the Soviet Union
Medalists at the 1970 Summer Universiade
Medalists at the 1973 Summer Universiade
Medalists at the 1977 Summer Universiade
Olympic female sprinters